Gaily Dube (born 25 July 1969) is a Zimbabwean sprinter. She competed in the 100 metres at the 1988 Summer Olympics and the 1992 Summer Olympics.

References

External links
 

1969 births
Living people
Athletes (track and field) at the 1988 Summer Olympics
Athletes (track and field) at the 1992 Summer Olympics
Zimbabwean female sprinters
Olympic athletes of Zimbabwe
Place of birth missing (living people)
Olympic female sprinters